The 32 mm cabinetmaking system is a furniture construction and manufacturing principle used in the production of ready-to-assemble and European-style, frameless construction custom cabinets and other furniture. The system is in wide use globally, partly owing to IKEA using some of its elements (principally the 32 mm shelf support holes) in its furniture. Characteristics are the columns of 5 mm holes on 32 mm centers. In addition to the 32 mm standard, there are other but less frequently used systems (System 25, ip20 etc.). The system allows reconfigurable shelf placement and spacing.

The system was developed by fitting, machine and furniture manufacturers, and serves to standardize both component dimensions and production processes. The design features are:
 Distance of the holes in the row of holes: 32 mm
 Diameter of the holes: 5 mm and 8 mm. A typical 5 mm shelf stud may measure 15-16 mm long, and has a thin flange of about 7 mm diameter halfway at its length.
 Distance of the front row of holes to the front edge: 37 mm

The system includes matching fittings, with which furniture sides can be secured to floors, walls, and adjacent cabinets. Other fittings are available for doorbands, drawer guides, clothes racks, floor racks, and other features, and typically mount into one or more of the 5 mm holes otherwise used to support shelf brackets.

Advantages of this system include:
 Distance from the first hole to the bottom side of the cabinet equals the distance from the last hole to the top of the cabinet top: Simplification of setting up single row drilling machines
 Distance of the rear row of holes to the rear edge is 37 mm, which does not require retooling of the drilling machine
 Distance of the rear row of holes to the inner edge back wall is 37 mm, which facilitates the assembly of rear wall supports
 Distance between the two rows of holes are in multiple of 32 mm, which facilitates the assembly of drawer guide

History 
It is claimed that the system was developed after the end of World War II in order to help speed reconstruction of the vast number of buildings destroyed during the war, that the spacing was decided upon because that was the closest that multiple drill bits on a line boring machine could be placed, because of the size of the gears then available.

Proprietary variants 
Multiple vendors sell drilling templates and routing machines that can be used to build System 32 cabinets, including:

 Blum's Process32 system
 Festool Hole Guide System
 Rockler
 True 32 system
 Veritas 32 Cabinetmaking System

Bibliography
 Buckley, Bob (1999). True32 Flow Manufacturing. 
 Proulx, Danny (2003). Building Frameless Kitchen Cabinets. 
 Christ, Jim (1995). Modern Cabinetry: European Design & Construction Techniques.

References

External links
 Dave Lers 32mm Cabinetmaking
 Dave Lers 32mm System Basics
 KISS II system
 Blum Process 32 Universal Boring Pattern
 Veritas 32 Cabinetmaking System
 Program Overview: System 32

Furniture